The list of acts of the 114th United States Congress includes all Acts of Congress and ratified treaties by the 114th United States Congress, which began on January 3, 2015, and lasted until January 3, 2017.

Acts include public and private laws, which are enacted after being passed by Congress and signed by the President; however, if the President vetoes a bill it can still be enacted by a two-thirds vote in both houses. The Senate alone considers treaties, which must be ratified by a two-thirds vote.

Summary of actions
President Barack Obama vetoed the following bills during the 114th Congress. The Justice Against Sponsors of Terrorism Act has been enacted by Congress over the President's veto.
 February 24, 2015: Vetoed , Keystone XL Pipeline Approval Act. Override attempt failed in Senate, 62–36 ( needed).
 March 31, 2015: Vetoed , A joint resolution providing for congressional disapproval under chapter 8 of title 5, United States Code, of the rule submitted by the National Labor Relations Board relating to representation case procedures. The Senate voted to table the veto message rather than vote on and override of the veto. Tabled 96-3.
 October 22, 2015: Vetoed , National Defense Authorization Act for Fiscal Year 2016.
 December 19, 2015: Vetoed , A joint resolution providing for congressional disapproval under chapter 8 of title 5, United States Code, of a rule submitted by the Environmental Protection Agency relating to "Standards of Performance for Greenhouse Gas Emissions from New, Modified, and Reconstructed Stationary Sources: Electric Utility Generating Units".
 December 19, 2015: Vetoed , A joint resolution providing for congressional disapproval under chapter 8 of title 5, United States Code, of a rule submitted by the Environmental Protection Agency relating to "Carbon Pollution Emission Guidelines for Existing Stationary Sources: Electric Utility Generating Units".
 January 8, 2016: Vetoed , the Restoring Americans' Healthcare Freedom Reconciliation Act of 2015. Override attempt failed in House, 241-186 (285 votes needed).
 January 19, 2016: Vetoed , A joint resolution providing for congressional disapproval under chapter 8 of title 5, United States Code, of the rule submitted by the Corps of Engineers and the Environmental Protection Agency relating to the definition of "waters of the United States" under the Federal Water Pollution Control Act 
  June 8, 2016: Vetoed , joint resolution disapproving the rule submitted by the Department of Labor relating to the definition of the term "Fiduciary".
  September 23, 2016: Passed over veto , Justice Against Sponsors of Terrorism Act.

Public laws

Private laws
No private laws were enacted this Congress.

Treaties
No treaties were enacted this Congress.

See also
 List of bills in the 114th United States Congress
 List of bills in the 115th United States Congress
 List of United States presidential vetoes#Barack Obama
 List of United States federal legislation
 List of Acts of the 113th United States Congress
 List of Acts of the 115th United States Congress

References

External links

 Authenticated Public and Private Laws from the Federal Digital System
 Legislation & Records Home: Treaties from the Senate
 Private Laws for the 114th Congress at THOMAS
 Public Laws for the 114th Congress  at THOMAS
 Public Laws for the 114th Congress at Congress.gov
 Private Laws for the 114th Congress at Congress.gov

114